Hôtel Regina is a grand hotel in Paris that opened in 1900. It is in the Place des Pyramides, across the Rue de Rivoli from the Jardin des Tuileries and an entrance to the Louvre. In the square in front of it is a gilded statue of Joan of Arc on horseback.

History 

Inaugurated in 1900 for the World's Fair in Paris, the hotel is on the Place des Pyramides, which takes its name from Napoleon's victory in Egypt in 1798. The hotel's building dates from the Second Empire. Léonard Tauber and his associate Constant Baverez built it between 1898 and 1900. It was named after Queen Victoria, symbolising the Entente Cordiale between the French and the British.

The first phase of the hotel's renovation was completed in summer 2014. Renovation of the second wing, begun in October 2014, was inaugurated on 29 September 2015. The renovations' estimated cost is 17 million euros. In November 2014, Piazzi was appointed as the new director, and in August 2015, the hotel received its fifth star from the Atout France agency.

The hotel is owned by Les Hôtels Baverez, which also manages Hôtel Raphael and Majestic Hôtel-Spa. The group, founded by Léonard Tauber, is currently run by Françoise Baverez and her daughter Véronique Valcke, descendants of Tauber's associate Constant Bavarez.

Characteristics 
The hotel is a five-star hotel that counts 99 bedrooms. Some rooms have views on the Jardin des Tuileries or the Louvre.

Restaurants 
The hotel chose Ladurée for its pastries.
The Lounge Club: located under the Arcades, facing the Louvre Museum.
Bar Anglais and its terrace: a location reminiscent of Victorian England.
La Terrasse Cour Jardin: a furnished and flowery interior terrace.
Tea Room: facing the Louvre Museum, it offers a selection of teas, chocolates, and pastries.

Filmography 
Numerous films have been filmed at the hotel since 1980:
 1980: The Lady Banker
 1984: The Blood of Others
 1984: L'Amour en héritage
 1986: The Joint Brothers
 1990: La Femme Nikita
 1997: Same Old Song 
 1998: Man Is a Woman
 2001: Kiss of the Dragon
 2002: The Bourne Identity
 2005: Incontrôlable
 2007: Sagan
 2008: Female Agents
 2009: The Extraordinary Adventures of Adèle Blanc-Sec
 2011: Upgrade
 2013:  RED 2

References

External links

 

Hotels in Paris
Buildings and structures in the 1st arrondissement of Paris
Preferred Hotels & Resorts
Hotels established in 1900
Hotel buildings completed in 1900
1900 establishments in France